The Quebec City International Festival of Military Bands (FIMMQ) was a major cultural event in Quebec City that notably included a military tattoo by Canadian and foreign military bands as well as display teams. It has taken place annually in August in Quebec City from 1998 to 2013.

Created in 1998, the FIMMQ were hosted by the local Military Bands, i.e. Les Voltigeurs de Québec and the Royal 22e Régiment. It welcomed, throughout the years, military and some civilian bands from Germany, Australia, Belgium, Chile, South Korea, the United States, France, Norway, the Netherlands, Poland, the United Kingdom, Russia, Singapore, Italy, Switzerland, Austria and the Czech Republic. Outdoor performances were held for the general public at various locations in and around the city and an indoor show, the Quebec City Military Tattoo, was held inside the Colisée Pepsi.

The festival was created in 1998 by Jacques DuSault, who wanted to offer outdoors music shows to emphasize the Old Quebec City. The Canadian Armed Forces were invited to contribute, with the implication of the retired Lieutenant Colonel Yvan Lachance, old ordering of the Voltigeurs de Québec, and Major Denis Bernier, who was then directing the Military Band of the Royal 22e Régiment. In 2013, after 15 years in existence, the tattoo was dissolved.

Quebec City Military Tattoo

The Quebec City Military Tattoo was an annual military tattoo that took place in Quebec City, the capital of the province of Quebec. Part of the Quebec City International Festival of Military Bands (FIMMQ), since 2005 the Quebec City Military Tattoo staged colourful and exotic performances, presenting a music show with choreographies and multi-media effects. This event gathered all the countries that participated at the FIMMQ. Military bands presented a stunning gathering of massed pipes and drums which could count 1200 musicians.

Before this tattoo, the first show to be held in Quebec City was in 1967 as part of Canadian Armed Forces Tattoo 1967, for the 100th anniversary of Canadian confederation. It had been organised by the Canadian Army. The 2008 tattoo was the largest one ever held, highlighting the FIMMQ as 10th anniversary and the 400th anniversary of Quebec City. During this edition of the tattoo, bands such as the Alexandrov Ensemble and the Singapore Armed Forces Band perform.

Gallery

External links
 Quebec City International Festival of Military Bands official website
 Canadian Armed Forces Tattoo 1967
Spirit of the Tattoo: The very best moments Quebec City Military Tattoo - Le Tattoo Militaire de Québec (2005-2010) DVD
2010 Quebec City Military Tattoo - Le Tattoo Militaire de Québec DVD & CD
2009 Quebec City Military Tattoo - Le Tattoo Militaire de Québec DVD & CD
2008 Quebec City Military Tattoo - Le Tattoo Militaire de Québec DVD & CD
2007 Quebec City Military Tattoo - Le Tattoo Militaire de Québec DVD & CD
2006 Quebec City Military Tattoo - Le Tattoo Militaire de Québec DVD
2005 Quebec City Military Tattoo - Le Tattoo Militaire de Québec DVD & CD

References

Recurring events established in 1998
Music festivals in Quebec City
Military tattoos
Tourist attractions in Quebec City
Military bands of Canada